The 1986 Virginia Slims of Arizona, also known as the Virginia Slims of Phoenix, was a women's  tennis tournament played on indoor hard courts at the Jordan Tennis and Racquet Center in Phoenix, Arizona in the United States and was part of the 1986 Virginia Slims World Championship Series. It was the inaugural edition of the tournament and was held from March 24 through March 30, 1986. Unseeded Beth Herr won the singles title.

Finals

Singles

 Beth Herr defeated  Ann Henricksson 6–0, 3–6, 7–5
 It was Herr's only singles title of her career.

Doubles
 Susan Mascarin /  Betsy Nagelsen defeated  Linda Gates /  Alycia Moulton 6–4, 5–7, 6–4

See also
 1986 WCT Scottsdale Open – men's tournament in Scottsdale

References

External links
 ITF tournament edition details
 Tournament draws

Virginia Slims of Arizona
Virginia Slims of Arizona
Virginia Slims of Arizona
Virginia Slims of Arizona